Welcome to the Western Lodge is the third studio album by the American rock band Masters of Reality, released in 1999.

Production
The album was produced by Chris Goss at his Monkey Studios.  Goss played all of the guitar parts.

Critical reception
Sound & Vision wrote that the album "rides the buzz and fuzz that [Goss] gave Queens of the Stone Age as co-producer of Rated R."

Track listing 
All songs by Chris Goss, except where noted.
"It's Shit" - 2:56
"Moriah" - 3:33
"The Great Spelunker" - 3:10
"Time to Burn" (Goss, John Leamy, Dave Catching) - 2:36
"Take a Shot at the Clown" (Goss, Leamy, Catching) - 3:52
"Baby Mae" - 3:14
"Why the Fly?" - 4:00
"Ember Day" - 0:54
"Annihilation of the Spirit" - 2:32
"Calling Dr. Carrion" - 3:22
"Boymilk Waltz" - 2:36
"Lover's Sky (Goss, John Russo) - 2:55
"Also Ran Song (Goss, Leamy)" - 2:59

Credits 
Chris Goss - vocals, guitar, keyboards, bass
John Leamy - drums, keyboards, bass

Additional personnel
Googe - bass on "Baby Mae"
Victor Indrizzo - drums on "Baby Mae"

References
 

Masters of Reality albums
1999 albums
Albums produced by Chris Goss